Marcello Andrei (born 1922) is an Italian film director and screenwriter.

Born in Rome, Andrei started his career in the early 1950s as assistant director, then he made his directorial debut in 1956 with Borung, a documentary film set in Indonesia. He is one of the founders of the Festival dei Popoli which has been held in Florence since 1959.

Filmography 
 Director and Screenwriter  
 1963 - La smania addosso ( The Eye of the Needle)
 1974 - Verginità
 1974 - Un fiocco nero per Deborah (a.k.a. A Black Ribbon for Deborah)
 1975 - Il tempo degli assassini (a.k.a. Season for Assassins)
 1976 - Scandalo in famiglia
 1977 - El Macho (as Mark Andrew) 
 1988 - Aurora Express, una forza al servizio della pace

 Director 
 1957 - Arcipelago di fuoco

 Screenwriter 
 1987 - Mosca addio

References

External links 

1922 births
Possibly living people
20th-century Italian screenwriters
Italian film directors
Writers from Rome
Italian male screenwriters